Brian K. Savage (born April 12, 1955) is a Republican member of the Vermont House of Representatives. He is one of two representatives from the Franklin-4 District that consists of the Towns of Swanton and Sheldon.  He was first elected to his seat in 2008 and won re-election in 2010 and again in 2012 as well as in 2014.  In late 2014 he was again re-elected as the Assistant Minority Leader by the House Republican Caucus. He is lifelong resident of Swanton and is married with three adult children.

References

1955 births
Living people
Republican Party members of the Vermont House of Representatives
People from Swanton (town), Vermont
21st-century American politicians